Damot may refer to:

Dʿmt, ancient kingdom in Eritrea and Ethiopia, the Horn of Africa
Kingdom of Damot, a medieval kingdom in what is now Eritrea and north of Ethiopia
Damot language, also called the Awngi language, a Cushitic language
Damot Sore, woreda in southern Ethiopia
Damot Pulasa, woreda in southern Ethiopia
Damot Weyde, woreda in southern Ethiopia
Damot Gale, woreda in southern Ethiopia
Docmo (town), a town the Somali region in Ethiopia also translated as Damot
Danot (also Damot), woreda in eastern Ethiopia